Mount Princeton is a high and prominent mountain summit of the Collegiate Peaks in the Sawatch Range of the Rocky Mountains of North America. The mountain was named in honor of Princeton University.

Mountain
While not one of the highest peaks of the Sawatch Range, Mount Princeton is one of the most dramatic, abruptly rising nearly 7,000 feet above the Arkansas River valley in only 6 miles.

The first recorded ascent was on July 17, 1877, at 12:30 pm by William Libbey of Princeton University.  It is likely that various miners had climbed the peak earlier. The name Mount Princeton was in use as early as 1873, and the peak was most likely named by Henry Gannett, a Harvard graduate and chief topographer in a government survey led by George M. Wheeler.

Historical names
Chalk Peak
Mount Princeton – 1906 
Princeton Mountain

See also
List of mountain peaks of North America
List of mountain peaks of the United States
List of mountain peaks of Colorado
List of Colorado fourteeners

References

External links
Mt. Princeton on 14ers.com

Princeton
Princeton
San Isabel National Forest
Princeton
Princeton